Vimy is a federal electoral district in Quebec, Canada, that has been represented in the House of Commons of Canada since 2015.

Vimy was created by the 2012 federal electoral boundaries redistribution and was legally defined in the 2013 representation order. It came into effect upon the call of the 42nd Canadian federal election, scheduled for 19 October 2015. It was created out of parts of the electoral districts of Laval (78%), Laval—Les Îles (12%) and Alfred-Pellan (11%).

Members of Parliament

This riding has elected the following Members of Parliament:

Election results

References

Quebec federal electoral districts
Politics of Laval, Quebec